Aaron Elam (born April 2, 1993), known by his video game moniker Ace, is an American professional Halo player who currently plays for TeamMETA. Elam is best known for winning the Halo 4 Global Championship FFA after beating Justin "iGotUrPistola" Deese in the finals, where he won $200,000. He is well known for his time on team Status Quo and Team Liquid.

Accolades
 Halo 4 Global Championship FFA

Team Liquid
 5-8th - X Games Aspen 2016

References

External links
 Twitch channel

OpTic Gaming players
Team Liquid players
Halo (franchise) players
American esports players
Twitch (service) streamers
People from Florence, Kentucky
University of Kentucky alumni
Living people
1993 births